Unguarded is the debut studio album by English singer and songwriter Rae Morris, released on 26 January 2015 by Atlantic Records.

The album was streamed in its entirety on the website of DIY magazine ahead of its release.

Critical reception

The album received favourable reviews in publications such as Digital Spy, DIY magazine, Drowned in Sound, The Guardian and The Observer. XFM named Unguarded its 'Album of the Week' at the end of January 2015.

Track listing

Charts

Release history

References

2015 debut albums
Rae Morris albums
Albums produced by Jim Eliot
Albums produced by Fryars
Albums produced by Ariel Rechtshaid
Atlantic Records albums